North and South Brother Islands may refer to:

North and South Brother Islands (Connecticut), United States
North and South Brother Islands (New York City), United States
The Brothers (Andaman and Nicobar Islands), in the Indian Ocean
The Brothers (New Zealand), in Cook Strait

See also 
 Brother Island (disambiguation)
 North Brother Island (disambiguation)
 South Brother Island (disambiguation)